Pet Supplies Plus (also styled Pet Supplies "Plus"), founded in 1988 in Redford, Michigan in the United States, is a privately held pet supply retailing corporation with a major presence in the US. As of 2005, it was the third largest specialty pet food retailer in the US. The company began adding franchise locations in the Midwest, expanding into the northeastern and southern states during the late 1990s. As of February 2021, Pet Supplies Plus store locations consisted of over 560 stores in 36 states. Pet Supplies Plus has in-house pet food brands such as Redford Naturals.

History
Pet Supplies Plus was founded in 1988 by Harry Shallop and Jack Berry, in Redford, Michigan.

In December 2018, Pet Supplies Plus was acquired by Sentinel Capital Partners.

In January 2021, the Franchise Group, Inc., announced it was acquiring Pet Supplies Plus, and the deal was closed on March 10, 2021.

References

External links
Official site

Retail companies of the United States
Retail companies established in 1988
Pet stores
Pets in the United States
2021 mergers and acquisitions